The 2017–18 Segunda División B season was the 41st since its establishment. The first matches of the season were played on 20 August 2017, and the season ended June 2018 with the promotion play-off finals.

Overview before the season
80 teams will join the league, including four relegated from the 2016–17 Segunda División and 18 promoted from the 2016–17 Tercera División. The composition of the groups was determined by the Royal Spanish Football Federation, attending to geographical criteria.

Relegated from Segunda División
UCAM Murcia
Mallorca
Elche
Mirandés

Promoted from Tercera División

Atlético Madrid B
Deportivo Aragón
Badajoz
Cerceda
Écija
Fabril
Formentera
Gimnástica Segoviana
Las Palmas Atlético
Lorca Deportiva
Olot
Ontinyent
Peña Deportiva
Peña Sport
Peralada
Rápido de Bouzas
Real Betis B
Sporting Gijón B
Talavera de la Reina
Unión Adarve
Vitoria

Group 1

Teams and locations

League table

Results

Top goalscorers

Top goalkeepers

Group 2

Teams and locations

League table

Results

Top goalscorers

Top goalkeepers

Group 3

Teams and locations

League table

Results

Top goalscorers

Top goalkeepers

Group 4

Teams and locations

League table

Results

Top goalscorers

Top goalkeepers

Average attendances
This is a list of attendance data of the teams that give an official number. They include playoffs games:

|}
Notes:
1: Team played last season in Segunda División.
2: Team played last season in Tercera División.

References

External links
Royal Spanish Football Federation

 

 
2017-18

3
Spa